The 2004 East–West Shrine Game was the 79th staging of the all-star college football exhibition game featuring NCAA Division I Football Bowl Subdivision players. The game featured over 90 players from the 2003 college football season, and prospects for the 2004 Draft of the professional National Football League (NFL). The proceeds from the East–West Shrine Game benefit Shriners Hospitals for Children.

The game was played on January 10, 2004, at 11 a.m. PT at SBC Park in San Francisco, and was televised by ESPN. One of the players in the game was Neil Parry of San Jose State, whose lower right leg had been amputated in October 2000; Parry played on special teams for the West squad and registered a tackle in the second quarter.

The offensive MVP was Ryan Dinwiddie (QB, Boise State), while the defensive MVP was Brandon Chillar (LB, UCLA).

Scoring summary 

Sources:

Statistics 

Source:

Coaching staff 
East head coach: Walt Harris

East assistants: Tom Freeman & Paul Rhoads

West head coach: John Robinson

West assistants: Bruce Snyder & Mike Bradeson

Source:

Rosters 
Source:

2004 NFL Draft 

Shrine game records indicate that 40 players in the game were selected in the 2004 NFL Draft. Players taken in the first three rounds:

Source:

References

Further reading 
 

East-West Shrine Game
East–West Shrine Bowl
American football in San Francisco
East-West Shrine Game
East-West Shrine Game
East-West Shrine Game